An Air So Pure or Un air si pur... is a 1997 French comedy-drama film directed by Yves Angelo.

Plot 
During the World War I, a doctor and a lawyer buy a huge house in a mountain to make both nursing home and resort home. Tenants flock, all of different nationalities, sick or healthy. All invent false identities, to appear to others what they aren't, because all dream of a future in which their destiny, tragic or comic, does not allow accomplishment.

Cast 

 Fabrice Luchini as Magnus
 André Dussollier as Doctor Boyer
 Marie Gillain as Julie d'Espard
 Yolande Moreau as Laure Surville
 Jacques Boudet as Monsieur Elmer
 Jerzy Radziwiłowicz as Daniel
 Jean-Pierre Lorit as Florent
 Édith Scob as Mademoiselle Sophie
 Krystyna Janda as Madame Leduroy
 Laura Betti as Madame Ruben
 Emmanuelle Laborit as Mathilde
 Grażyna Wolszczak as Milady
 Nicolas Vaude as Simon
 Redjep Mitrovitsa as Moss
 Roberto Della Casa as Monsieur Ruben
 Andrzej Szenajch as Schnitzer

Accolades

References

External links 

1997 films
1997 comedy-drama films
Films based on works by Knut Hamsun
Films directed by Yves Angelo
Films set in hospitals
Films set in the 1910s
French comedy-drama films
1990s French-language films
1990s French films